The men's long jump at the 2014 European Athletics Championships took place at the Letzigrund on 15 and 17 August.

Medalists

Records

Schedule

Results

Qualification
Qualification: Qualification Performance 8.00 (Q) or at least 12 best performers advance to the final

Final

References

Qualification Results
Final Results

Long jump
Long jump at the European Athletics Championships